The Big Creek Bridge is a -long, open spandrel, concrete deck arch bridge located on the southern portion of the Big Sur coast of California, along State Route 1 near Lucia. Opened for traffic in 1938, it crosses Big Creek Canyon on this scenic, mountainous coast.

History
Constructed during the Great Depression and identified by Caltrans as Bridge No. 44 0056, it was opened for traffic in late 1938.  Its construction was partially funded by the federal government in connection with the Works Progress Administration.
Situated high above Big Creek canyon, this bridge has remained open while many others on the Pacific Coast Highway have been closed due to mud slides. There are parking areas at both ends of the bridge to allow motorists to stop and take photographs.

Design and construction
Christian Theophil Gutleben, noted for his reinforced concrete arch bridges throughout the California coast and in the Los Angeles area, was the designer. The structure got a seismic retrofit in 1999.

References

External links

 May 1939 California Highways and Public Works article

Road bridges in California
Open-spandrel deck arch bridges in the United States
California State Route 1
Bridges in Monterey County, California
Concrete bridges in California
Bridges completed in 1938
Big Sur